The women's heptathlon at the 2022 Commonwealth Games, as part of the athletics programme, took place in the Alexander Stadium on 2 and 3 August 2022.

Records
Prior to this competition, the existing world and Games records were as follows:

Schedule
The schedule was as follows:

All times are British Summer Time (UTC+1)

Results
Competitors contested a series of 7 events over two days, with their results being converted into points. The final standings were decided by their cumulative points tallies.

100 metres hurdles
Results:

High jump
Results:

Shot put
Results:

200 metres
Results:

Long jump
Results:

Javelin throw
Results:

800 metres
Results

Standings

References

Women's heptathlon
2022
2022 in women's athletics